Behkadeh-ye Razavi (also Romanized as Behkadeh-ye Raẕavī; also known as Behka deh-e-Rājī, Behkadeh-ye Shāhābād, and Shāhābād) is a village in Jeyransu Rural District, in the Central District of Maneh and Samalqan County, North Khorasan Province, Iran. At the 2006 census, its population was 957, in 281 families.

References 

Populated places in Maneh and Samalqan County